Phosphorescent Harvest is the third studio album by the Chris Robinson Brotherhood. It was released in the US on April 29, 2014.

Track listing
All songs written by Chris Robinson and Neal Casal, except where noted.

On the LP release, there is an additional 7" with "Humboldt Windchimes"/"Star Crossed Lonely Sailor."

Personnel
Chris Robinson Brotherhood
Chris Robinson – lead vocals, guitar
Neal Casal – guitar, vocals
Adam MacDougall – keyboards, vocals
Mark Dutton – bass, vocals
George Sluppick – drums

Others
Thom Monahan – production, engineering, mixing
Geoff Neal – assistant engineer
Nicolas Essig – additional assistant engineer
JJ Golden – mastering
Amy Finkle – featured artist
Larry Carlson – cover art ("Hudson River Sunset Deluxe")
Alan Forbes – inside panel and owl artwork
Neal Casal – 7" back cover photo, innersleeve photos and photo textures
Craig Santiago – "Sower" line art

References

2014 albums
Chris Robinson Brotherhood albums
Albums produced by Thom Monahan